Lower Redwater Lake is a freshwater lake in the municipality of Temagami of Northeastern Ontario, Canada. It is located near the settlement of Redwater. The primary outflow is the Marten River.

See also
Lakes of Temagami

References

Lakes of Temagami